Kasangga Mo ang Langit (English: You're Up Against the Sky) is a current affairs program which airs the different issues in the Philippines. Kasangga Mo ang Langit is aired back-to-back with companion show Biyaheng Langit every Saturday at 2:00 pm to 3:00 pm PST over Net 25. and is produced by Heavenly Images Productions for Television, Inc. And also on a Live Radio and TV program is hosted by Rey Langit and his sons Reyster Langit and JR Langit also via Radyo Agila which airs every Monday to Friday at 8:00 am to 10:00 am.

The show has been hosted by Rey Langit after his failed senatorial bid in the 1998 Presidential Elections through the Partido ng Demokratikong Reporma–Lapiang Manggagawa (Reporma–LM). His first co-host was the late Reyster Langit, who died of heart failure due to cerebral malaria, a disease he contracted in Palawan while he was on assignment. He was replaced by his brother, Reynante "JR" Langit, Jr.

History
Kasangga Mo ang Langit was first aired on RPN from July 10, 1998, to March 10, 2007. Rey Langit, who had an unsuccessful senatorial bid in the 1998 Presidential Elections through the Partido ng Demokratikong Reporma–Lapiang Manggagawa (Reporma–LM), was joined by his late son Reyster Langit (who served as main host alongside his father from 1998 until his death in 2005).

The Death of Reyster Langit
On June 2, 2005, Reyster died of heart failure due to cerebral malaria, He was 32 years old, a disease he contracted while on assignment in Palawan.
Reyster wrote a letter to his family

He was interred at Manila Memorial Park in Parañaque.

JR replaces his brother Reyster                                                                                                                                                              
Following his death, Rey's surviving son, JR, has since joined him not only for Kasangga Mo ang Langit but also for Biyaheng Langit.

The show moved to IBC from January 5, 2008, to September 13, 2013, and later moved to PTV from September 22, 2013, to August 31, 2019, and later moved to RJTV from September 7, 2019, to October 22, 2022.

Rey Langit's departure
On February 12, 2022, Rey Langit bid farewell to the show to run for senator and his friend former Ulat Bayan anchor Erwin Tulfo to run for Partylist following that, JR Langit remained as a sole host and continued his role until 2022. By that time, it was reformatted as a magazine show.

Hosts
Main hosts
Rey Langit (1998–2010, 2010–2022, 2022-present)
JR Langit (2005–present)
Aljo Bendijo (substitute/replaced host for Langit; 2022–present)
Former Hosts
Reyster Langit+ (1998-2005)

See also
 List of programs previously broadcast by Radio Philippines Network
 List of programs previously broadcast by Intercontinental Broadcasting Corporation
 List of programs aired by People's Television Network
 List of programs broadcast by RJTV
 List of programs broadcast by BEAM TV

References

External links

Philippine television shows
1998 Philippine television series debuts
1990s Philippine television series
2000s Philippine television series
2010s Philippine television series
2020s Philippine television series
People's Television Network original programming
Radio Philippines Network original programming
RPN News and Public Affairs shows
Intercontinental Broadcasting Corporation original programming
IBC News and Public Affairs shows
Filipino-language television shows